The Muna or Wuna are an indigenous group that inhabits Muna Island, Southeast Sulawesi, Indonesia. From the physical appearance of the body, skull, skin color (dark brown), and hair (curly or wavy) it appears that the aboriginal Muna people are closer to the ethnic groups of Polynesians and Melanesians in the Pacific and Aboriginal Australians compared to the Buginese or Malays. This is evident by the similarities of the people and their culture with of those in the East Nusa Tenggara, and the islands of Timor and Flores generally. Woven sarong motifs found in East Nusa Tenggara and Muna Island share similar features such as horizontal lines with basic colors of yellow, green, red, and black. The shape of their headwear also has a resemblance to each other. Since before until today, Muna fishermen often harvest sea cucumbers and go fishing up to the waters of Darwin, Australia in the Timor Sea. This has caused Muna fishermen to have been arrested several times in these waters by the Australian government. These habits may probably indicate the existence of a traditional relationship between the Muna people with Aboriginal Australians.

Culture
Traditional kite flying of the Muna people is called the Kaghati Kolope (Kolope leaf kite), as it is made from Dioscorea hispida leaf. It is thought that the kaghati kolope were used by the farmers as a means of entertainment while looking after their field. Apart from that, it is believed that the kaghati kolope will transform into an umbrella to protect its owner from the sun in the afterlife.

Karia ceremony
In Muna community, there is a circle of life ceremony for each individuals that begins from the ceremony of birth up to the ceremony of death. In order to perform the ceremony, the individual is required to go through each stages. One of the stages is the advancement of childhood to adulthood, especially for women, and the ceremony is called Karia and for the Butonese people it's called Pusuo.

The Karia ceremony is a very important ceremony in the context of traditional customary throughout the life of the individual in Muna society. Karia ceremony is an initiation ritual performed for every woman to be secluded before entering adulthood and marriage. According to the understanding of the Muna society, that a woman should not be married if she has not undergone the process of Karia ceremony. If violated, the woman will feel excluded and will be ostracized within their own community.

Kasambu tradition
Kasambu is a tradition passed down for generations held by the community of the Muna people in Southeast Sulawesi, Indonesia. This tradition is a form of thanksgiving for the safety of the wife who will be giving birth to her child. This tradition is usually held before the birth of the child, usually in the 7th or 8th month. For the first seven months of the pregnancy, both husband and wife will bathe together. The Kasambu procession begins with a couple of husband and wife feeding each other. Once fed, it has to be eaten once or finish; if unless the food is not finished, then the rest is given to the children that are present around them. Children that are participating is usually taken from close relatives. The act of feeding one another is then continued by the rest of the family members of the husband and wife. The expressed meaning of this procession came is to bring together both the families of the husband and wife. While the implied meaning of the procession acts as a vehicle to introduce the unborn child to the circle of family that the child will soon be raised into. The purpose of the ceremony is to bring well wishes and blessings for the unborn child as well as for the safety of both the mother and child in delivery. The procession is ended with a prayer for good wishes by a person of religious position, priest or imam.

Notable people
Saddil Ramdani, Indonesian footballer

References

Ethnic groups in Indonesia
Sulawesi